In South America, Google Street View is available in parts of Colombia, Brazil, Peru, Chile, Argentina, Ecuador, Bolivia and Uruguay. This article covers all of South America. For Central America and the Caribbean, see Google Street View in North America.

Background

Brazil
In September 2010, the first cities from Brazil were added. The service started with 51 cities, most from São Paulo, Rio de Janeiro, Belo Horizonte and greater metropolitan areas. Historic cities such as Ouro Preto, Diamantina and Tiradentes were also included. Google is expecting to cover 90% of Brazilian streets in two years.

Google is also working on "Street View" for Brazil's rainforests. Pedal-powered trikes are being used to film the forests, and boats with 3-D cameras are being used to navigate the Amazon River.

In the initial release of Brazil's Street View, two dead bodies were found in the images. These were later removed.

Filming of Street View in Brazil began in April 2009.

Chile

Filming of Street View in Chile began in January 2012. On September 25, 2012, parts of Chile were added including Santiago, Valparaíso, Viña del Mar and Concepción. Many more cities and roads were released during 2013. In March 2015 the country counts with mostly full coverage.

Colombia 
On September 3, 2013, parts of Colombia were added. Some cities like Bogotá, Barranquilla, Montería, Cúcuta, Ibagué, Barrancabermeja, Caucasia, Valledupar, Yopal, Aguachica, Soledad, Villavicencio, Manizales, Zipaquirá, Floridablanca, Carmen de Bolívar, Fundación, Cartagena, Bucaramanga, Santa Marta, Santa Rosa de Cabal and more.

Ecuador 
Some coverage became available on the Galapagos Islands on September 12, 2013, mostly from a boat. For the mainland Street view was released on November 12, 2015 in Quito, Guayaquil, Cuenca, Santo Domingo (limited), Machala, Durán, Portoviejo, Manta, Loja, Ambato, Esmeraldas, Quevedo, Riobamba, Milagro, Ibarra, La Libertad, Babahoyo, Sangolquí, Daule, Latacunga, Tulcán, Chone, Santa Rosa, Nueva Loja, Huaquillas, Santa Elena, Cayambe, Salinas, General Villamil Playas .

Peru 
On August 14, 2013, Google Street View became available for six cities: Lima, Arequipa, Trujillo, Chiclayo, Iquitos and Piura. Later 2013 some long road stretches became available.

Argentina

On September 25, 2013, Google announced the arrival of the service to Argentina. On October 2 took place the official presentation of the Trikes in Congressional Plaza, Buenos Aires; the service was expected to be available by the end of the year in Buenos Aires, Buenos Aires Province, Cordoba, Rosario, Santa Fe, Entre Ríos, Mendoza and La Plata. As of September 25, 2014, Argentina was added to Street View.

Bolivia

On November 28, 2014, Google started filming in Santa Cruz de la Sierra but street view will be also available in La Paz, Cochabamba, Sucre and El Alto. For security reasons, Google decided not reveal how many cars will take photos. Additionally, Bolivian media are not allowed to interview their drivers. Images will be appear on street view some time in 2015.

Uruguay

On June 26, 2015, Google started to photograph the streets of Uruguay. The service became available online on 2 December 2015.

Timeline of introductions

* Limited coverage.

Areas included
Reference:



















Countries without any coverage

,
,
,
,

All these countries have photo spheres, 360-degree panorama photos similar to the street view photos, accessible in Google Maps.

Competing products
Argentina: Two Argentine street view services have existed. Mapplo was claimed to be the first street view in Latin America. Mapplo closed in 2012. Fotocalle, another Argentine project, is claimed to be the first street view in the world that provides HD pictures. Fotocalle is not working as of November 2020.
Chile: Chilean company Publiguías released a service similar to Google's Street View in December 2010 called "Street Diving". It offers views of Providencia and Santiago communes, with plans to expand it to other communes in the future. XYGO launched a street view service in April 2011 partially covering seven cities.

References

South America
Communications in South America
Latin American media
Maps of the Americas